Acinetobacter celticus is a psychrotolerant bacterium from the genus of Acinetobacter which occurs in soil and water.

References

External links
Type strain of Acinetobacter celticus at BacDive -  the Bacterial Diversity Metadatabase

Moraxellaceae
Bacteria described in 2016